Sitophora is a genus of moths of the family Erebidae. The genus was erected by Achille Guenée in 1854.

Species
Sitophora lyces H. Druce, 1891 Panama
Sitophora sueralis (Guenée, 1854) Brazil
Sitophora vesiculalis Guenée, 1854 Brazil

References

Herminiinae